Jeff Cornwall (born May 29, 1991 in Coquitlam, British Columbia) is a lacrosse player for the Calgary Roughnecks in the National Lacrosse League. Cornwall was drafted in the second round (15th overall) of the 2011 NLL Entry Draft by the Buffalo Bandits. His brother Travis plays for the Panther City Lacrosse Club.

After playing five games for the Buffalo Bandits in his rookie year, Cornwall was traded to the Edmonton Rush for two second round draft picks in the 2012 Entry Draft (Jordan Critch and Carter Bender). He was selected by the New York Riptide in the 2019 Expansion Draft. New York traded him back to the now-Saskatchewan Rush prior to the season for the 10th overall pick (Tyson Bomberry) in the 2019 draft. In the 2022 Expansion Draft, he was selected by the Las Vegas Desert Dogs. Las Vegas traded him to Calgary for Marshal King and their 1st round pick (18th overall, Austin Hasen) in the 2022 Entry Draft.

Statistics

NLL

References

1991 births
Living people
Buffalo Bandits players
Calgary Roughnecks players
Canadian lacrosse players
Edmonton Rush players
People from Coquitlam
Saskatchewan Rush players
Sportspeople from British Columbia